Diles is a surname. Notable people with the surname include:

Dave Diles (1931–2009), American sports broadcaster, journalist, and author
Dave Diles Jr. (born 1962), American athletic director
Nicky Diles (born 1992), Australian motorcycle racer
Zac Diles (born 1985), American football linebacker